A duck pond is a pond for ducks and other waterfowl. Duck ponds provide habitats for water fowl and other birds, who use the water to bathe in and drink.

Typically, such ponds are round, oval or kidney-shaped. An example is the lily pond in the University Parks at Oxford in England, constructed in 1925. Often, as in public parks, such ponds are artificial and ornamental in design. Sometimes they may be less ornamental, as for example in a farmyard or flooded quarry. A small domestic version of the duck pond is at Knowle Farm in Derbyshire.

Some duck ponds are purposely built for the sport of duck hunting. These flight ponds are constructed by hunters and wildfowlers to attract ducks, such as mallard, teals, bufflehead and wigeon, at dawn and at dusk. The ponds have shallow edges to allow ducks to reach food on the bottom. Barley is often used to attract or hold the birds.

Duck houses
A duck house, duck canopy, or duck island, is an often floating structure that onto or into which ducks can climb, offering protection from predators such as foxes. Some are simple wooden shelters on land, while others are on islands in duck ponds or lakes; they can be quite ornate and/or large structures. A rather famous example can be found at Woodway House in Devon, England. A small domestic version of a duck house is at Knowle Farm in Derbyshire. Such houses are also used for the birds to nest in a safe and convenient area. Dummy eggs, originally ceramic and now plastic, are used to encourage birds to lay in the duck house.

Installation and maintenance
They must be cleaned out about every month to prevent an unwanted and rather smelly buildup of fecal matter (guano) that is gradually left behind by the birds using it. They may also be prone to flooding during a storm, if they are not raised adequately off the ground.

Media reference
Duck islands came to public prominence in the United Kingdom in May 2009, when a Member of Parliament claimed expenses to have one installed on his property. Sir Peter Viggers chose to stand down as an MP after he was shown to have attempted to pay for his duck island at the UK Parliament's expense.

See also

Ponds
Duck-baiting
Duck
The Big Duck building
Poultry
Water fountains
Woodway House
Hen house
Dog house
Pilling's Pond
Long Duck Pond

References

External links
 Friends of the Duck Pond — OUPD
 The University Parks, Oxford — Introduction

Ducks in popular culture
Ducks
Garden features
Ponds